A resort is a place used for relaxation or recreation, attracting visitors for holidays or vacations.

Resort may also refer to:

 Resort Air, former name of Trans States Airlines
 Resorts of Suriname, second-level administrative divisions
 Resort Township, Michigan
 Resort wear, a clothing style and a year-round "season" in the fashion industry.

See also 
 Last resort (disambiguation)
 Resorte, a Mexican musical group
 The Resort (disambiguation)